Sabrina Vallis is a valley in the Lunae Palus quadrangle of Mars, located at 11.0° North and 49.0° West. It is 280 km long and was named after the classical name of the River Severn in England and Wales.

References

External links
 

Valleys and canyons on Mars
Lunae Palus quadrangle